Scott Silverman may refer to:

 Scott J. Silverman (born 1957), American lawyer and judge
 Scott K. Silverman, professor of chemistry